Saprinus discoidalis is a species of clown beetle in the family Histeridae. It is found in North America.

Subspecies
These two subspecies belong to the species Saprinus discoidalis:
 Saprinus discoidalis amplus Casey
 Saprinus discoidalis discoidalis

References

Further reading

 

Histeridae
Articles created by Qbugbot
Beetles described in 1851
Beetles of North America